Priyanka Mohan, better known by her stage name Avantika Mohan is an Indian actress and model. She made her feature film debut with Yakshi – Faithfully Yours and later earned popularity through the TV series Athmasakhi.

Early life
Avanthika Mohan was born and brought up in Dubai. Her parents are from Calicut. She returned to Kerala to pursue a modelling career and won the Miss Malabar 2011 title and also the subtitle Miss Perfect 2010. She is a dancer and had taken training for it. After winning the beauty pageant, she began to receive acting offers and decided to enter the film industry. She received three consequent best actress awards in 2017.

Career
She made her debut in the 2012 experimental film Yakshi – Faithfully Yours, directed by Abhiram Suresh Unnithan, featuring all newcomers in the lead roles. The film saw Avanthika playing the titular character of a "snake ghost" named Nagayakshi, a snake who turns into a woman after coming to the planet. In 2013, she was part of the Malayalam comedy flick Mr Bean- The Laugh Riot, after which she was seen in Neelakasham Pachakadal Chuvanna Bhoomi. She next played a lead role in crocodile love story. She made her Tamil film debut with the horror film Aalamaram (2014). Her next releases were Vundile Manchi Kalam Mundu Munduna, her first Telugu film, and debutant director Shyam Mohan's thriller 8:20 released and the movie went on well she got good appreciation for her performance from the Critics and the audiences. She had signed film Male Baruva Munna, an Oriya movie and a Hindi movie directed by Samagra Ganesh is based on a true story. She has also signed Rajavin Parvai Raniyin Pakkam, to be directed by Azhagu Raj.

Television debut
In May 2016, she signed into play lead role in TV series Athmasakhi in Malayalam language in which she plays a bold and modern character Nanditha who is a doctor by profession. Later in June she made her Telugu Television debut through Raja Rani in which she plays a strong and innocent school teacher. She is getting positive reviews from both TV series. She twice received best actress awards back to back.  After a sabbatical she is paired up with Rajyan Rajan after Athmasakhi in the new series Priyapettaval which is going on-air in Mazhavil Manorama from late 2019 which portrays the misunderstandings in married life.

Personal life
Avanthika married Anil Kumar Kainth in 2017. The couple has a son Rudraunsh Kainth.

Filmography

Television

References

External links

Official website

Living people
People from Dubai
Actresses from Kozhikode
Actresses in Malayalam cinema
Actresses in Tamil cinema
Actresses in Malayalam television
Actresses in Telugu television
Actresses in Telugu cinema
Indian film actresses
Actresses in Kannada cinema
21st-century Indian actresses
Indian television actresses
Indian expatriates in the United Arab Emirates
Year of birth missing (living people)